Priscilla Block (born August 11, 1995) is an American country music singer–songwriter. Upon graduating high school, she moved to Nashville, Tennessee to pursue a career in the country industry. In 2020, Block wrote and recorded a song that appeared on her TikTok account. It subsequently went viral. That song, "Just About Over You", was heard by Nashville music executives and helped her secure a contract with Mercury Nashville. Released as a single, "Just About Over You" became a charting song on the American country chart in 2021.

Early life
Block is a native of Raleigh, North Carolina and is one of five children. According to Block, she grew up "super close" to her family. In an interview with Sounds Like Nashville, she recounted spending a lot of time outdoors with her family during childhood. From an early age, she had aspirations of becoming a country artist. "I was gonna move to Nashville and chase this dream, and everybody looked at me like I was crazy," she told Songwriter Universe. She also learned to play the guitar at an early age. Block began performing in North Carolina, including the Deep South Bar, which is located in Raleigh. In 2014, she moved to Nashville, Tennessee to pursue her goals in the country music industry. Upon settling into her new environment, Block worked a variety of odd jobs to make a living. During her early years in Nashville, Block was unhappy and considered moving home. One day, she had a chance encounter with Taylor Swift while walking down a Nashville road. Swift pulled the car over and invited her inside. "That was truly the day that I decided that I really needed to give music a fair shot and do this thing," she commented.

Career
Block began her country music career by co-writing songs with other people. She also would "sit for hours" watching Nashville artists perform. She also played several popular Nashville bars including the Listening Room Cafe and Whiskey Jam. In 2017, Block released her debut extended play (EP) titled Different Route. The project was recorded in a closet studio by a producer whom Block asked to help her cut her own material. Between 2016 and 2020, Block released several songs focused around self-love and acceptance. Penned by Block herself, these tracks included "Thick Thighs" and "PMS". Many of these recordings appeared on the social media platform TikTok. Block began releasing music on the app during the COVID-19 pandemic. "I started posting original music and those videos started doing really, really well. It was interesting because I would post cover videos and then I would post my own videos and my own original music was kind of what was working," she explained.

After running into an ex-lover in 2020, Block composed the song "Just About Over You". She posted herself singing the song live on TikTok and the video went viral. A fan of her music in California created a GoFundMe campaign to get it recorded. Three weeks after its composition, Block cut the song in a studio. "Just About Over You" then went to number one on the iTunes music chart and topped other streaming platforms. Still an unsigned artist, Block received multiple offers from Nashville record labels. Ultimately, Block chose to sign with Mercury Nashville. The label issued "Just About Over You" shortly after her 2020 signing. Mercury then released a radio edit of "Just About Over You", which was produced by Ross Copperman. months later, Block filmed a music video for the song, directed by Logen Christopher. It subsequently peaked at number 81 on the Billboard Hot 100 and became a top 20 hit single on the Billboard country charts.

Musical style and influences
Block's musical style blends country music with pop and southern rock. Writer James Christopher Monger described Block as, "a country-pop artist who found success in 2020 with a string of relatable singles that effectively paired earworm melodies with unfiltered lyrics." According to Block herself, she does not "commit to one sound or genre of music". "It's a little sass, a little trash and a little sad," she commented. Block has cited Kelly Clarkson, Luke Combs, Miranda Lambert, Dolly Parton and Chris Stapleton as musical influences.

Discography

Studio albums

Extended plays

Singles

Promotional singles

Music videos

Awards and nominations

!
|-
| 2021
| Academy of Country Music Awards
| New Female Artist of the Year
| 
| align="center"| 
|-
| 2022
| CMT Music Awards
| Breakthrough Video of the Year – "Just About Over You"
| 
| align="center"| 
|-
|}

References

External links
 Official website

1995 births
21st-century American women singers
21st-century American singers
American women country singers
American country singer-songwriters
Country musicians from North Carolina
Living people
Mercury Records artists
People from Raleigh, North Carolina
Singer-songwriters from North Carolina